Derek Seguin (born 1972) is a Canadian stand-up comedian. Of mixed French Canadian and Irish descent, he is best known for comedy which plays on the cultural differences between English Canada and French Canada, which he performs in an intentionally exaggerated stereotype of a Québécois accent.

In October 2015, Seguin won the 6th annual Canadian Top Comic competition, presented by SiriusXM Canada in association with the Just For Laughs festival.

He is a regular performer at comedy festivals across Canada, including Just for Laughs and the Winnipeg Comedy Festival, appears regularly on the CBC Radio comedy series The Debaters, and appeared with Sebastien Bourgault in the comedy web series Language Police in 2013.

In 2008, he collaborated with Mike Ward and Maxim Martin on "French Comedy Bastards", a touring show which brought Quebec-style comedy — a style which blends stand-up and sketch elements more freely than is typical in English Canada — to anglophone audiences.

His comedy album PanDerek (1st Wave!) received a Juno Award nomination for Comedy Album of the Year at the Juno Awards of 2021.

References

1971 births
Canadian stand-up comedians
Comedians from Quebec
Living people
Quebec people of Irish descent
Quebecers of French descent
21st-century Canadian comedians
Canadian male comedians